The Murri Affair is a 1974 historical drama film directed by Mauro Bolognini, starring Giancarlo Giannini and Catherine Deneuve. It is based on real events of a notorious 1902 murder trial. It was awarded with a David di Donatello for Best Film.

Cast
 Giancarlo Giannini as Tullio Murri
 Catherine Deneuve as Linda Murri
 Fernando Rey as Augusto Murri
 Tina Aumont as Rosa Bonetti
 Rina Morelli as Giannina Murri
 Ettore Manni as Dr. Carlo Secchi
 Paolo Bonacelli as Francesco Bonmartini
 Giacomo Rossi Stuart as Riccardo Murri
 Laura Betti as Tisa Borghi
 Corrado Pani as Pio Naldi
 Marcel Bozzuffi as Inspector Stanzani
 Lino Troisi

References

External links
 
 
 

1974 films
1974 crime drama films
1970s French films
1970s historical drama films
1970s Italian films
1970s Italian-language films
Crime films based on actual events
Drama films based on actual events
Films about miscarriage of justice
Films directed by Mauro Bolognini
Films scored by Ennio Morricone
Films set in 1902
Films set in Bologna
Films set in Switzerland
Films set in Venice
French crime drama films
French films based on actual events
French historical drama films
Italian crime drama films
Italian films based on actual events
Italian historical drama films
Italian-language French films